"Born to Rock 'n' Roll" is a song recorded by English singer Cliff Richard and released in the UK in May 1986 as his third single from the musical soundtrack Time (Dave Clark album). The song reached number 28 in the Irish Singles Chart, but only minor positions outside the top 40 in the UK and Australia.

Track listing
UK 7" Single (EMI 5545)
"Born to Rock 'n' Roll"
"Law of the Universe"

UK 12" Single (12 EMI 5545)
"Born to Rock 'n' Roll" (Special Extended Mix)
"Born to Rock 'n' Roll" 
"Law of the Universe"

Personnel
From the inner sleeve of Dave Clark's 'Time' The Album:
Cliff Richard – lead vocal
Dave Stewart – keyboards
Billy Squire – guitars
Graham Jarvis – drums
Jerry Hay – bass guitar
Billy Squire – backing vocals

Chart performance

References

1986 singles
1986 songs
Cliff Richard songs
Songs written by Dave Clark (musician)